A constitutional referendum was held in Mauritania and Senegal on 21 October 1945 as part of the wider French constitutional referendum. The first question on the new French National Assembly serving as a constituent assembly was approved by 99% of voters, but the temporary constitution proposed in the second question was rejected by 51% of voters. Both proposals were approved in the overall vote. Voter turnout was 60.4%.

Results

Question I

Question II

References

1945 referendums
October 1945 events in Africa
1945
1945 in Mauritania
1945
1945 in Senegal